Edina Altara (1898–1983) was an Italian illustrator, decorator and fashion designer from Sassari.

In the thirties she was devoted to ceramics, fashion and decoration. A versatile artist, skilled designer, sensitive and imaginative illustrator and fashion designer, after the amicable separation from her husband in 1934, she opened her own studio in Milan which attracted a sophisticated clientele.

From 1941 to 1943 she worked with the magazine Grazia. She illustrated over 30 children's books, including Storie di una Bambina et una Bambola (1952). Her work was likely included in the 1950-53 exhibition Italy at Work: Her Renaissance in Design Today (from the Brooklyn Museum and the Art Institute of Chicago). This work was in a 'Special Interior' designed by architect Gio Ponti.

Altara and Ponti collaborated on a number of projects. A painted chest of drawers (ca. 1951) was recently sold for £250,000.

Bibliography

External links
Sardinia Culture article

References 

Italian decorators
Italian fashion designers
Italian women fashion designers
1898 births
1983 deaths
People from Sassari
Italian women illustrators
Sardinian women